Chiang Mai International Exhibition and Convention Centre (CMECC) is a convention centre and exhibition hall located in Chiang Mai, Thailand. Operated by the Thai Ministry of Finance's Treasury Department. With 60,000 m2 indoor space made it into the largest convention and exhibition building in Thailand outside Bangkok and with 52.16 hectares of total area made it into the largest convention and exhibition center of Southeast Asia

References

External links 
 Official website of CMECC

Convention centers in Thailand
Buildings and structures completed in 2013
2013 establishments in Thailand
Tourist attractions in Chiang Mai
2010s in Chiang Mai